Mabel-Canton Public Schools (MC I.S.D. #238) is a school district headquartered in Mabel, Minnesota. The district, which also serves Canton, has a single campus with all grades, K-12.

It includes sections of Fillmore County and Houston County. It also has an agreement with the Decorah Community School District to take students from parts of Winneshiek County, Iowa.

 the district had a total of about 280 students. Another school district document circa 2020 gave the enrollment count as 283.

History

On July 1, 1966, the consolidated school district, a merger of the Mabel and Canton schools, opened. The district began using blue and white as school colors, with one each from a predecessor district. Red is used as an "accent color".

In 2001 the North Winneshiek Community School District ended its high school program. That year it entered into an agreement with Mabel-Canton Schools to allow students from its boundary to attend the Mabel-Canton high school program.

In 2018 the combined interim board of Decorah Community School District and North Winneshiek district in Iowa approved an agreement with Mabel-Canton, effective for five years, to allow students in the former North Winneshiek district boundary to attend Mabel-Canton if they choose. Decorah CSD had absorbed North Winneshiek CSD effective July 1, 2018. The agreement applies to any post-merger resident of Decorah CSD  who is geographically closer to Mabel than to Decorah, Iowa, where all Decorah CSD campuses are located. In April 2019 the Mabel-Canton district anticipated that an additional 15-20 students from North Winn would begin attending Mabel-Canton in the start of the subsequent school year.

In 2018 the Minnesota Legislature gave the district $433,500 to improve the security of its campus. This was in response to a wave of school shootings occurring elsewhere in the country.

Campus
The school gymnasium has the logos of the two predecessor districts and of the North Winneshiek district. Phil Richert, a former North Winneshiek board member, donated the North Winneshiek logo in a period prior to 2020, inspiring the Mabel-Canton leadership to get the other two.

References

Further reading
 Maps of Iowa areas which send students to this district
  - Map of the Decorah school district - Students from northern portions of this map may enroll in Mabel-Canton
 Compare with the map of the former North Winneshiek District, absorbed by Decorah (and which once had an agreement with Mabel-Canton)

External links
 Mabel-Canton Public Schools

School districts in Minnesota
Education in Fillmore County, Minnesota
Education in Houston County, Minnesota
Education in Winneshiek County, Iowa
1966 establishments in Minnesota
School districts established in 1966